This is a list of Latter Day Saints who have attained levels of notability. This list includes adherents of all Latter Day Saint movement denominations, including the Church of Jesus Christ of Latter-day Saints (LDS Church), Community of Christ, and others.
Members of the LDS Church are usually considered either "active", meaning they attend church on a regular basis and are committed to living their religion, or "less active" or "inactive", meaning they do not attend church regularly and/or they do not adhere to its principles. See List of former Latter Day Saints for a list of persons who ended their affiliation with Latter Day Saint movement religions.

Artists

Sports figures

American football and Canadian football

Association football (soccer)

Baseball

Basketball

Ice hockey

Rugby

Rugby league

Rugby union

Miscellaneous

Track & Field

 Valerie Adams, Olympic shot putter, reigning women's Olympic champion
 Doug Padilla, 1985 Outdoor Mobil Grand Prix champion, two-time Olympian 1984 Summer Olympics and 1988 Summer Olympics
 Ed Eyestone, two-time Olympian 1988 Summer Olympics and 1992 Summer Olympics
 Alma Richards, won gold in track and field in the 1912 Summer Olympics (USA)
 Jason Smyth, blind Irish athlete who won four gold medals in the Paralympics

Auto racing
 David Abbott "Ab" Jenkins (1883–1956)

Beach volleyball
 Jake Gibb
 Casey Patterson

Bodybuilding
 Larry Scott, the first Mr. Olympia (1965)

Boxing
 Jack Dempsey, heavyweight boxing champion
 B. J. Flores, United States amateur heavyweight champion, 2001 and 2002
 Gene Fullmer, middleweight boxing champion
 Joseph Parker, heavyweight boxing champion
 Willard Bean, middleweight boxing champion|date=1905

Golf
 Billy Casper
 Keith Clearwater
 Johnny Miller
 Tony Finau
 Daniel Summerhays

Gymnastics
 Mykayla Skinner, 2020 US Olympic Vault Silver Medalist 
 Peter Vidmar, Olympic gold medalist

Martial arts
 Diego Brandao, UFC fighter, won The Ultimate Fighter 14
 Ed Parker (1931–1990), martial artist

Rodeo
 Earl W. Bascom, "father of modern rodeo"; inventor and innovator
 Lewis Feild, World champion
 Reg Kesler, Canadian champion, rodeo producer
 Raymond Knight, Hall of Fame, rodeo producer, "father of Canadian stampedes"
 Dale D. Smith, Consecutive Team Roping Championships 1956–1957, Inducted into the Pro Rodeo Hall of Fame in 1977, Inducted into the National Cowboy Hall of Fame in 1995

Snowboarding
 Torah Bright, Australian Olympic gold medalist, and X Games gold medalist.

Swimming
Hayley Palmer, New Zealand swimmer
Byron Shefchik, BYU

Volleyball
 Richard Lambourne, 2008 Olympian
 Taylor Sander, 2016 Olympian

Wrestling
 Chyna
 Rulon Gardner, 2000 gold medalist
 Cael Sanderson, 2004 gold medal, undefeated NCAA champion

Business

Law

Judicial

Enforcement
 Samuel P. Cowley (1899–1934), FBI agent killed in the line of duty by Baby Face Nelson
 Porter Rockwell, Deputy US Marshal of Salt Lake City (1849–1878); bodyguard of LDS founder Joseph Smith

Educators and scholars

Media and entertainment figures

Writers

Film, television and stage personalities

Singers and musicians

Dance
Brandon Armstrong, dancer appearing on So You Think You Can Dance and Dancing with the Stars
Lindsay Arnold, dancer appearing on So You Think You Can Dance and Dancing with the Stars
Witney Carson, winner of Dancing with the Stars 19th season
Chelsie Hightower, ballroom dancer and choreographer
Derek Hough, 5-time winner of Dancing with the Stars, brother of Julianne Hough 
Sara Webb, professional ballet dancer (1997–2018), principal dancer with Houston Ballet.

Medicine
Richard F. Daines, New York State Department of Health Commissioner
Russell M. Nelson, (president of The Church of Jesus Christ of Latter-day Saints) physician, heart surgeon, Director American Board Thoracic Surgeons, Chair Thoracic Surgery Salt Lake Hospital, University Hospital (world renowned) first open heart surgery heart lung support machine under Dr. Gibbon, Mayo Clinic, Philadelphia "Top 20 Most Innovative Surgeons Alive Today" 
Ellis Reynolds Shipp,  SLC, one of the first female doctors west of the Mississippi, a compassionate genius protege'. 1847 – 1939,  sent to Penn Med School (women's/Hanneman) by Eliza Snow on Dr.Willard Richards endowment 1873 as directed by the prophet, returning,' worked with Sis.Snow's board to start obstetrics school 1876, trained 660 midwives., went to Michican for pediatrics under pioneer Victor Vaugh who created American Pediatrics Board, returning created LDS Children's hospital under relief society, bolstered by St. Marks Hospital Salt Lake.
Willard Richards,1804-1854 Obstritician Thompson Infirmary Med School Boston 1835. Apostle 1840 2nd counsler 1847, migrated Salt Lake 1847–9, expedition secretary and medic/surgeon. Opened Deseret (Salt Lake) LDS clinic under Relief Society 1849 SLC. Started Deseret Newes<column on health. Trained Midwives many starting as girls. Treated gold rush miners 1849–50.

Scientists and inventors

Military

Commanders

U.S. Medal of Honor recipients

Politics

US politicians

Currently in office

U.S. Senate

U.S. House of Representatives
 Mike Simpson (R–Idaho)
 Chris Stewart (R–Utah)
 Burgess Owens (R–Utah)
 John Curtis (R–Utah)
 Andy Biggs (R–Arizona)

Governors
 Spencer Cox (R–Utah)

Past office holders

U.S. Senate

U.S. House of Representatives

U.S. governors

Cabinet officers, ambassadors and senior administration officials

Other American politicians

Politicians outside the United States

Royalty
 'Elisiva Fusipala Vaha'i, Tongan princess
 Prince Ata, Tongan prince

Church leaders

Presidents of the Church of Jesus Christ of Latter-day Saints (largest denomination, ≈16,000,000 adherents)

Presidents of the Community of Christ (≈250,000 adherents)

Presidents of the Fundamentalist Church of Jesus Christ of Latter-Day Saints (≈10,000 adherents)

Leaders of smaller factions

References

External links
 Links to Lists of Famous Latter-day Saints
 The Mormon 100: A Ranking of the 100 Most Influential Latter-day Saints in History
 Mormons in Business

Lists of Christians

Latter Day Saint movement lists